Miriam Adhikari is a physician and scientist specialising in paediatrics with a focus on neonatology.  She is Emeritus Professor at the University of KwaZulu-Natal and a neonatologist at the Nelson Mandela School of Medicine.  She also has a focus on paediatric nephrology and is a member of the Academy of Science of South Africa.

Research 
Miriam Adhikari specialises is paediatrics and infectious disease and has co-authored over 100 publications.

Awards 
She was awarded the Annual Service Excellence Award by the KwaZulu-Natal government in 2017. She said her main focus was to teach the nursing staff the importance of managing the mothers and babies.

References

External links

Further reading

South African women scientists
Living people
South African paediatricians
Members of the Academy of Science of South Africa
Women pediatricians
Academic staff of the University of KwaZulu-Natal
South African women physicians
South African physicians
21st-century women scientists
21st-century South African scientists
21st-century South African physicians
21st-century women physicians
Year of birth missing (living people)